Bruno Benetton Free Band is a Slovak electro-rock group, currently based in Bratislava, Slovakia. The members are:
 Tomáš Palonder — lead vocals
 Michal Neffe — guitar, backing vocals
 Martin Krížik — piano, synthesizer, backing vocals
 Juraj Varga – bass guitar, backing vocals
 Michal Danielis — keyboards, programming
 Michal Uličný — drums
 Marek Hradský — guitar

Biography 
In 2006, Martin Krížik met Michal Neffe while both were browsing in a local music store. They hit it off immediately and decided to see if they could do something unique with their common musical interests. Within two years they had found a couple of other musicians who were happy to take part in their musical experiments and in 2009 with the final addition of Tomáš Palonder they became the Bruno Benetton Free Band. 
In November 2010 they released their debut album :sk:The Phenomenons of Pop.

Many musicians from Europe was participating on the debut album :sk:The Phenomenons of Pop. One of them is Stefano Forcella from the Italian band Modà. Stefano has recorded bass line for the song "Oua He".

Since then, the Bruno Benetton Free Band has played such venues as the NuSpirit Club, Spring Urban Market, Slovak Radio, and Voices Live. Their songs "You're my mate" and "For sure" has been featured on Rádio FM and Musiq 1 TV. They won a national music contest organized by T-Mobile company. Bruno Benetton Free Band has collaborated with musicians from both Europe and the United States of America. One of these efforts can be viewed in the music video "Stars are memory" recorded in Austin, Texas, by director Mark Winslett, with singer Nathan Lively. Bruno Benetton Free Band has also co-written songs, including "Stars are memory," with award-winning poet Richard Lance Williams from Austin, Texas. In 2012 two songs from the album "The phenomenons of Pop" were nominated for :sk:Radio Head Awards 2010 by Rádio FM.

Bruno Benetton Free Band as an opening act 
 Lavagance: Prievidza - Element Club, 2011
 The KOLORS (IT): Bratislava - NuSpirit Club, 2011
 PHINX (IT): Bratislava  - MMC Club, 2012

Discography 
:sk:The Phenomenons of Pop ( 2010 The Phenomenons of Pop (CD))

Awards and nominations

Videos 
Oua he 2011
You're my mate 2011
Stars are memory 2011
For sure 2011
Clothed in roots and fire 2011

References

External links 
 

Slovak rock music groups